Trichomycterus diatropoporos is a species of pencil catfish endemic to Brazil, where it occurs in the da Prata and Turvo river basins, tributaries of the das Antas river, in the Laguna dos Patos system in the state of Rio Grande do Sul. This species reaches a maximum length of  SL.

Etymology
The specific name diatropoporos is derived from the Greek diatropos, meaning variable, and poros, meaning pore, and refers to the variation in the presence of pores i1 and i3 of the infraorbital sensory canal of the species.

Habitat and ecology
At the species' type locality (Passo do Despraiado, municipality of Nova Prata), the da Prata river is rapid flowing, wide and shallow, with an average depth of 0.5 m, clear water, rocky bottom and large amounts of submerged vegetation.

T. diatropoporos feeds on larvae of Diptera (Chironomidae, Simuliidae) and nymphs of Ephemeroptera.

References

Further reading

External links

 

diatropoporos
Fish of South America
Fish of Brazil
Endemic fauna of Brazil
Fish described in 2013